Azogues Canton, is the administrative district in the province of Caňar. Its capital town is Azogues of the same name, which is also the capital of the province.

Cantons of Cañar Province